Lim Jong-hoon (born 21 January 1997) is a South Korean table tennis player.

Lim and Jang Woo-jin were the men's doubles winners at the 2016 Belarus Open, the 2018 Korea Open, and the 2018 ITTF World Tour Grand Finals. Lim also won men's singles at the 2018 Polish Open.

References

External links

South Korean male table tennis players
1997 births
Living people
World Table Tennis Championships medalists
Sportspeople from Busan
Universiade medalists in table tennis
Universiade silver medalists for South Korea
Universiade bronze medalists for South Korea
Table tennis players at the 2018 Asian Games
Asian Games bronze medalists for South Korea
Asian Games medalists in table tennis
Medalists at the 2017 Summer Universiade
Medalists at the 2018 Asian Games